The 4th Emmy Awards, retroactively known as the 4th Primetime Emmy Awards after the debut of the Daytime Emmy Awards, were presented at the Cocoanut Grove in Los Angeles, California on February 18, 1952. The ceremonies were hosted by Lucille Ball and Desi Arnaz.

This was the first year that nominations were considered on a national television network basis. Previously, the Emmys were primarily given out to shows that were produced or aired in the Los Angeles area.

Winners and nominees
Winners are listed first, highlighted in boldface, and indicated with a double dagger (‡).

Programs

Acting

Hosting

References

External links
 Emmys.com list of 1952 Nominees & Winners
 

004
Emmy Awards
1952 in American television
February 1952 events in the United States
1952 in Los Angeles